Tchintoulous  (also written as Tintellust and Tin Telloust) is a village in the Arlit Department of the Agadez Region of northern-central Niger.

External links
Satellite map at Maplandia

Populated places in Niger
Agadez Region